Sadoun is the name of:

Surname 
Arthur Sadoun (born 1971), French businessman, chairman and CEO of Publicis
Medi Sadoun (born 1973), French actor

Given name 
Sadoun al-Zubaydi, English literature professor
Sadoun Salman (born 1977), Kuwaiti footballer
Sadoun Hammadi (1930–2007), briefly Prime Minister of Iraq